Vladimir Ilyich Makeranets (born 6 May 1947) is a Soviet and Russian director of photography, producer and film director, Head of the Ural Department of the Russian Union of Filmmakers, president of the Ural Guild of Cinematographers.

Vladimir Makeranets was born in Sverdlovsk. He worked at the Sverdlovsk Film Studio since he was 16, graduated from the Gerasimov Institute of Cinematography in 1979. In 1980 he joined the Union of Filmmakers. As a director of photography, he worked on 56 films, including live action and documentary films. He directed 5 films.

Selected filmography 
2007: The Golden Snake (Золотой полоз) — director, producer
2001: Privet, malysh! (Привет, малыш!, lit. "Hi baby!") — director, screenwriter
1995: Stendovye ispytanija (Стендовые испытания) — director of photography
1993: Ty est (Ты есть, lit. "You exist")  — director
1991: Gubernator (Губернаторъ) — director
1990: V polose priboja (В полосе прибоя, lit. "In the surf zone") — director of photography
1989: Moj milyj Chizh (Мой милый Чиж)  — director
1988: Budni i prazdniki Serafimy Gljukinoj (Будни и праздники Серафимы Глюкиной) — director of photography
1986: Vremja svidanij  (Время свиданий, lit. "Dating time") — director of photography
1985: V streljajushhej glushi (В стреляющей глуши) — director of photography
1984: Dom na djunah (Дом на дюнах, lit. "The house in the dunes") — director of photography
1983: Semyon Dezhnev (Семён Дежнёв) — director of photography
1982: Tem, kto ostaetsja zhit (Тем, кто остается жить) — director of photography
1980: Na beregu bolshoj reki (На берегу большой реки) — director of photography

References

External links

  Filmography

1947 births
Gerasimov Institute of Cinematography alumni
Russian cinematographers
Soviet cinematographers
Russian film directors
Mass media people from Yekaterinburg
Living people